The Iceman Cometh Also Known as The Time Warriors, is a 1989 Hong Kong martial arts fantasy film directed by Clarence Fok, starring Yuen Biao, Maggie Cheung and Yuen Wah. The film was released in Hong Kong on 18 August 1989.

Yuen Biao and Yuen Wah (alongside their opera school brother Yuen Tak) also served as action choreographers on the film. Similar to Highlander the film combines elements of sci-fi and historical fantasy with a contemporary setting and action. The film was nominated for three Hong Kong Film Awards in 1990. The film is not related to the Eugene O'Neill play.

A remake, titled simply Iceman, was released in April 2014 and a sequel to that remake, Iceman: The Time Traveller on November 2, 2018.

Plot
In 16th Century China, Ming guard Fong Sau-ching (Yuen Biao) relentlessly tracks the ruthless villain Feng San (Yuen Wah), who is notorious for raping and killing women. Feng San murders the princess and the emperor is furious that Fong Sau-ching wasn't able to save her. He gives Fong one last chance to capture Feng San within 20 days. After Feng San steals the priceless and magical Black Jade Buddha, a magical artifact that grants user the ability to time travel; Fong and Feng San are transported to 300 years in the future. Upon arrival, a titanic martial arts encounter atop a cliff ensues and is only ended when the two men tumble into a glacier where they are instantly frozen. Later being thawed out and awaken by scientists, Fong Sau-ching must continue his pursuit of his quarry although to survive in 1980s Kowloon with the confounding discovery of electricity, TV and toilets, he's going to need a little help from femme fatale Polly (Maggie Cheung). Polly hires Fong to be her servant and bodyguard since she knows of his martial arts expertise and in return she will help him get an ID card. Fong feels extremely shameful for not being able to capture Feng San and once a royal guard like himself is now a servant to a woman. 
Meanwhile, Feng San is still out and about and he's now a thief working for the local crime boss. He kills his boss after he was caught trying to rape his boss' girlfriend and a fight started. He then kills her in a brutal fashion of breaking her limbs. Later, Fong finds out that this whole time Polly was a prostitute and she's been using him the whole time, so he vows to not be her slave any longer. Around the same time, Fong reads a newspaper about a woman who's been murdered and her limbs are broken. He is instantly reminded of how Feng San kills his victims and now knows he's still alive. Feng San kidnaps Polly by pretending to be one of her clients. Fong goes to rescue her and is forced to admit that he loves Polly when Feng San has held her hostage. A big fight between Fong and Feng San ensues with Feng San being the victor and Fong severely injured but is able to recover after making it to the hospital. 
Feng San learns that the Buddha's wheel, the magical device that sent him to the future has been dug up and transported to a Hong Kong exhibit. He steals a load of firearms from the local arms dealer and plans to take the modern firearms back to the 16th century and conquer the dynasty. Fong is also aware of the Buddha's Wheel and predicts that Feng San will be there. He then trains for the upcoming battle and crafts a sword to combat Feng San. After finishing the sword he leaves Polly without her noticing because he doesn't want her to get involved. At the exhibit, Feng San finds a note on the wheel written by Fong that tells him to come up to the roof for the Black Jade, which he needs to activate the time travel device. On the roof top, Fong confronts Feng San and tells him that no matter what happens he will fulfill his duty to the emperor and take Feng San back to pay for his crimes. Fong eventually kills Feng San by impaling him on shards of broken glass. He takes Feng San's body and activates the Buddha's wheel. Polly arrives at the scene but was too late. She watches tearfully as Fong leaves. Some time later, Polly quits being a prostitute and is now working at a corner store. As she went to take out the trash, she runs into a man who resembles Fong (possibly a reincarnation). She shouts with joy that Fong is still alive and leaps onto him even though the man has no idea who she is.

Cast
 Yuen Biao as Fong Sau-ching / Fang Shou-zheng
 Maggie Cheung as Polly
 Yuen Wah as Feng San
 Tai Po as Pimp (Chang's thug)
 Elvis Tsui as Chinese Scientist
 Corey Yuen as Bum
 Stanley Fung as Santa Claus
 Jing Chen as Arms Dealer
 Liu Wai-hung as Angel
 Wong Jing as Crane Operator
 Alvina Kong as Hooker
 Sarah Lee as Hooker
 Sin Lap-man as Robber
 Yuen Tak as Person (extra)
 John Cheung as Doctor
 Cho Tat-wah as Zheng's uncle instructor
 Lau Chau-sang as Chang's thug
 Lai Yin-san
 Anthony Wong Yiu-ming as the emperor of the Ming Dynasty (cameo)

Production
The film's opening fight scene was filmed on location in Korea. This part of the shoot was troubled by snowstorms. This was extreme weather some members of the crew suffered from frostbite while filming.  The climactic fight scene took a month to shoot.

Reception
The film was a modest hit grossing HK$14 million at the Hong Kong box office.  The film appears in Jonathan Rosenbaum's 1,000 favourite films list.  He praises Maggie Cheung's comedic performance in particular.

Awards
The film was nominated for the following awards at the Hong Kong Film Awards:

 Best Action Choreography
 Best Cinematography
 Best Film Editing

Home media
DVD was released in All Regions in the United States on  27 April 1999, it was distributed by Tai Seng Video Marketing. On 25 July 2005, DVD was released by Hong Kong Legends in the United Kingdom in Region 2.

References

External links
 

1989 films
1989 fantasy films
1989 martial arts films
1980s Cantonese-language films
Hong Kong fantasy comedy films
Films set in Hong Kong
Films about time travel
Golden Harvest films
Hong Kong fantasy films
Kung fu films
Martial arts fantasy films
Hong Kong martial arts films
Hong Kong slapstick comedy films
1980s Hong Kong films